Richard Geller (born 1952) is president of Boston-based MedWorks Corporate Meditation Programs that provides stress reduction courses based on meditation to corporations and their employees. His company serves corporations such as the Reebok division of Adidas, Medtronic, and Genzyme. Geller advises employers to use employee feedback in building their stress reduction and meditation program. Since 1996, he has also been a volunteer for the weekly meditation classes at Suffolk County House of Corrections, the Boston county jail as part of the Prison Mindfulness Institute.

Geller graduated from University of Massachusetts Medical School's "Practicum in Mindfulness-Based Stress Reduction" program, under the direction of Jon Kabat-Zinn.

References 

Living people
1952 births